"Everything She Wants" is a song by the British pop duo Wham!

Everything She Wants may also refer to:

 "Everything She Wants" (D:TNG episode), an episode of the television show Degrassi: The Next Generation
 "Everything She Wants" (Being Erica episode), an episode of the television show Being Erica
 Margaret Thatcher: Everything She Wants, the second volume of the authorized biography by Charles Moore